Hakon Barfod (17 August 1926 – 4 November 2013) was a Norwegian sailor and Olympic champion. He was born in Oslo. He competed at the 1948 Summer Olympics in London, where he received a gold medal in the dragon class as crew member on the boat Pan.

He competed at the 1952 Summer Olympics in Helsinki, where he again received a gold medal with Pan.

References

External links

1926 births
2013 deaths
Norwegian male sailors (sport)
Olympic sailors of Norway
Sailors at the 1948 Summer Olympics – Dragon
Sailors at the 1952 Summer Olympics – Dragon
Olympic gold medalists for Norway
Olympic medalists in sailing
Medalists at the 1952 Summer Olympics
Medalists at the 1948 Summer Olympics
Sportspeople from Oslo